Zdenka Žebre (15 November 1920 – 2011) was a Slovene writer, best known for her books with an African theme.

Early years
Žebre was born in Ljubljana in 1920. She studied Law but her studies were interrupted by the Second World War. In 1963 she moved to Africa with her husband and lived in Ethiopia and Ghana for over a decade.

Writing career
Africa inspired her to start writing and she worked on her novel Okomfu Anoči about the Ashanti priest and statesman Okomfo Anokye. She continued to use Africa as an inspiration for her work, including the three children's books she published. She also wrote a memoir of her life in Africa in the autobiographical novel entitled Se spominjaš Afrike (Do You Remember Africa?), published in 2003.

Published works

 for adults

 Okomfu Anoči (Okomfo Anokye), 1982
 Kamen na srcu (A Stone on the Heart), 1996
 Se spominjaš Afrike? (Do You Remember Africa?), 2003

 for children
 Jernejček v daljni deželi (Jernejček in a Far Away Land), 1979 
 Petra in gazela Frčela (Petra and Frčela the Gazelle), 1987
 V čudežni svet in nazaj (To the Magic Land and Back), 1997

See also

References

1920 births
2011 deaths
Slovenian children's writers
Slovenian women children's writers
Slovenian women writers
Writers from Ljubljana
Yugoslav writers